Spencer County is the name of two counties in the United States:

Spencer County, Indiana
Spencer County, Kentucky